An evil twin is an antagonist character in many fictional works.

Evil twin may also refer to:

Film and TV
 Evil Twin (film), a 2007 South Korean horror film
 The Evil Twin, TV movie with Tomas Chovanec, Tanya Clarke

Games
 Evil Twin: Cyprien's Chronicles, a 2001 video game by Ubisoft and In Utero
 Evil Twins, two villains from the video game Crash Twinsanity

Music
 Evil Twin (EP), a 1993 EP by Hammerhead, or its titletrack
 "Evil Twin" (song), a 2019 song by Meghan Trainor
 "Evil Twin", a song by Eminem from the album The Marshall Mathers LP 2, 2013
 "Evil Twin", a song by Anthrax from the album For All Kings, 2016
 "Evil Twin", a song by Arctic Monkeys, a b-side to the single "Suck It and See", 2011
 Evil Twin, a nickname of the Fender Twin amplifier manufactured 1994-2001
 The Evil Twin, a nickname of the guitarist for Black Label Society Nick Catanese (born 1971)

Other uses
 Evil twin (wireless networks), a method used to facilitate phishing
 Evil Twin Brewing, a gypsy brewery in Denmark